The 2011 New Zealand gallantry awards were announced via a Special Honours List on 1 October 2011, although the awards made to Serviceman A and Serviceman F were not made public until 8 March 2018 for security reasons. All the awards were made in recognition of actions by New Zealand armed forces personnel in Afghanistan during 2010.

New Zealand Gallantry Star (NZGS)
 Corporal Albert Henry Moore – Royal New Zealand Infantry Regiment

New Zealand Gallantry Decoration (NZGD)
 Lance Corporal Allister Donald Baker – Royal New Zealand Infantry Regiment
 Corporal Matthew John Ball – Royal New Zealand Corps of Signals

New Zealand Gallantry Medal (NZGM)
 Serviceman F – New Zealand Special Air Service
 Warrant Officer Class Two Denis Joachim Wanihi – Royal New Zealand Army Logistic Regiment

New Zealand Distinguished Service Decoration (DSD)
 Serviceman A – New Zealand Special Air Service

References

New Zealand Royal Honours System
Gallantry awards
Hon
New Zealand gallantry awards